Jack Lowe may refer to:

Jack Lowe Sr. (1913–1980), American businessman
Jack Lowe Jr. (born 1939), American businessman
Jack Lowe (English footballer) (1900–?), English footballer
Jack Lowe (Australian footballer) (1890–1944), Australian rules footballer

See also
John Lowe (disambiguation)